Jessica Anderson may refer to:
Jessie Valentine née Anderson (1915–2006), Scottish amateur golfer
Jessica Anderson (writer) (1916–2010), Australian novelist and short story writer
Jessica Anderson (footballer) (born 1997), Australian rules footballer
Jessie Anderson (The Walking Dead), a character on The Walking Dead

See also
Jessica Andersen (born 1973), American writer
Jessica Andersson (born 1973), Swedish singer